The Rockwell scale is a hardness scale based on indentation hardness of a material. The Rockwell test measures the depth of penetration of an indenter under a large load (major load) compared to the penetration made by a preload (minor load). There are different scales, denoted by a single letter, that use different loads or indenters. The result is a dimensionless number noted as HRA, HRB, HRC, etc., where the last letter is the respective Rockwell scale.  Higher numbers correspond to harder materials.

When testing metals, indentation hardness correlates linearly with tensile strength.

History 

The differential depth hardness measurement was conceived in 1908 by Viennese professor Paul Ludwik in his book Die Kegelprobe (crudely, "the cone test"). The differential-depth method subtracted out the errors associated with the mechanical imperfections of the system, such as backlash and surface imperfections. The Brinell hardness test, invented in Sweden, was developed earlier – in 1900 – but it was slow, not useful on fully hardened steel, and left too large an impression to be considered nondestructive.

Hugh M. Rockwell (1890–1957) and Stanley P. Rockwell (1886–1940) from Connecticut in the United States co-invented the "Rockwell hardness tester," a differential-depth machine. They applied for a patent on July 15, 1914. The requirement for this tester was to quickly determine the effects of heat treatment on steel bearing races.  The application was subsequently approved on February 11, 1919, and holds . At the time of invention, both Hugh and Stanley Rockwell worked for the New Departure Manufacturing Co. of Bristol, CT.<ref>S.W. Kallee: Stanley Pickett Rockwell Stanley Pickett Rockwell - One of the Inventors of the Rockwell Hardness Testing Machine]. Retrieved on 21 November 2018.</ref> New Departure was a major ball bearing manufacturer which in 1916 became part of United Motors and, shortly thereafter, General Motors Corp.

After leaving the Connecticut company, Stanley Rockwell, then in Syracuse, NY, applied for an improvement to the original invention on September 11, 1919, which was approved on November 18, 1924.  The new tester holds .S. P. Rockwell, "Hardness-Testing Machine", Nov 1924. Rockwell moved to West Hartford, CT, and made an additional improvement in 1921. Stanley collaborated with instrument manufacturer Charles H. Wilson of the Wilson-Mauelen Company in 1920 to commercialize his invention and develop standardized testing machines.  Stanley started a heat-treating firm circa 1923, the Stanley P. Rockwell Company, which still exists in Hartford, CT.  The later-named Wilson Mechanical Instrument Company has changed ownership over the years, and was acquired by Instron Corp. in 1993.

 Models and operation 

The Rockwell hardness test can be conducted on several various hardness testers. All testers, however, fall under one of three categories. Bench model hardness testers can be found either in a digital or analog model. Digital bench models utilize a digital display and typically take more technical training to be able to operate, whereas the analog models are simpler to operate as well as very accurate and display results on a dial on the front of the machine. All bench model testers are usually found within a workshop or laboratory setting. Other testers are portable, and all portable testers will come in a digital model including a digital results screen similar to that of the bench digital model.  Portable testers are  practical and easy to use.

The determination of the Rockwell hardness of a material involves the application of a minor load followed by a major load.  The minor load establishes the zero position.  The major load is applied, then removed while still maintaining the minor load. The depth of penetration from the zero datum is measured from a dial, on which a harder material gives a lower measure.  That is, the penetration depth and hardness are inversely proportional. The chief advantage of Rockwell hardness is its ability to display hardness values directly, thus obviating tedious calculations involved in other hardness measurement techniques. 

The Rockwell test is very cost-effective as it does not use any optical equipment to measure the hardness based on the small indention made, rather all calculations are done within the machine to measure the indention in the specimen, providing a clear result in a manner in which is easy to read and understand once given. This also prevents any reworking or finishing needing to be done to the specimen both before and after testing. However, it is critical to double check specimens as the smallest indentions made from testing could potentially result in incorrect measurements in hardness, leading to catastrophe. After time, the indenter on a Rockwell scale can become inaccurate as well and need replacing to ensure accurate and precise hardness measurements.

It is typically used in engineering and metallurgy. Its commercial popularity arises from its speed, reliability, robustness, resolution and small area of indentation.

Legacy Rockwell hardness testers operation steps:

 Load main load: reference below form / table 'Scales and values'. 
 Leave the main load for a "dwell time" sufficient for indentation to come to a halt.
 Release load; the Rockwell value will typically display on a dial or screen automatically.

In order to get a reliable reading the thickness of the test-piece should be at least 10 times the depth of the indentation. Also, readings should be taken from a flat perpendicular surface, because convex surfaces give lower readings. A correction factor can be used if the hardness of a convex surface is to be measured.

 Scales and values 

There are several alternative scales, the most commonly used being the "B" and "C" scales. Both express hardness as an arbitrary dimensionless number.

 Except for testing thin materials in accordance with A623, the steel indenter balls have been replaced by tungsten carbide balls of the varying diameters.  When a ball indenter is used, the letter "W" is used to indicate a tungsten carbide ball was used, and the letter "S" indicates the use of a steel ball. E.g.: 70 HRBW indicates the reading was 70 in the Rockwell B scale using a tungsten carbide indenter.

The superficial'' Rockwell scales use lower loads and shallower impressions on brittle and very thin materials.  The 45N scale employs a 45-kgf load on a diamond cone-shaped Brale indenter, and can be used on dense ceramics.  The 15T scale employs a 15-kgf load on a  hardened steel ball, and can be used on sheet metal.

The B and C scales overlap, such that readings below HRC 20 and those above HRB 100, generally considered unreliable, need not be taken or specified.

Typical values include:

 Very hard steel (e.g. chisels, quality knife blades): HRC 55–66 (Hardened High Speed Carbon and Tool Steels such as M2, W2, O1, CPM-M4, and D2, as well as many of the newer powder metallurgy Stainless Steels such as CPM-S30V, CPM-154, ZDP-189. There are alloys that hold a HRC upwards 68-70, such as the Hitachi developed HAP72. These are extremely hard, but also somewhat brittle.)
 Axes: about HRC 45–55
 Brass: HRB 55 (Low brass, UNS C24000, H01 Temper) to HRB 93 (Cartridge Brass, UNS C26000 (260 Brass), H10 Temper)

Several other scales, including the extensive A-scale, are used for specialized applications. There are special scales for measuring case-hardened specimens.

Standards 

 International (ISO)
 ISO 6508-1: Metallic materials—Rockwell hardness test—Part 1: Test method (scales A, B, C, D, E, F, G, H, K, N, T)
 ISO 6508-2: Metallic materials—Rockwell hardness test—Part 2: Verification and calibration of testing machines and indenters
 ISO 6508-3: Metallic materials—Rockwell hardness test—Part 3: Calibration of reference blocks
 ISO 2039-2: Plastics—Determination of hardness—Part 2: Rockwell hardness
 US standard (ASTM International)
 ASTM E18: Standard methods for Rockwell hardness and Rockwell superficial hardness of metallic materials

See also 

 Brinell hardness test
 Hardness comparison
 Holger F. Struer
 Knoop hardness test
 Leeb Rebound Hardness Test
 Meyer hardness test
 Mineral
 Shore durometer
 Tensile strength
 Vickers hardness test

References

External links 

 Video on the Rockwell hardness test
  Hardness Conversion Chart
 Rockwell to brinell conversion chart
 Hardness Conversion Table
 Rockwell Hardness Testing

Dimensionless numbers
Hardness tests